Jerzy Nikitorowicz (born August 19, 1951 in Mielnik, Poland) is professor of pedagogics, dr. hab., rector of the University of Białystok, Poland (2005–2012).

References

1951 births
Living people
People from Siemiatycze County
Polish educators
Academic staff of the University of Białystok